Confidential Lady is a 1939 British comedy drama film, directed by Arthur B. Woods and starring Ben Lyon and Jane Baxter. It is now classed as a lost film.

Plot
Jill Trevor (Baxter) vows revenge on newspaper baron Sir Joshua Morple (Athole Stewart), who she holds responsible for ruining her father. Her very public antics to draw attention to Morple's despicable conduct come to the notice a rival newspaper, who send journalist Jim Brent (Lyon) to offer to write up Jill's story, in the hope that he will be able to dig up some dirt on Morple. Jim is initially sceptical, seeing Jill as a silly attention-seeking airhead, but as he gets to know her he changes his mind and realises there is substance to her claims, so the pair join forces to discredit Morple publicly, at the same time as starting to fall in love with each other.

Cast
 Ben Lyon as Jim Brent
 Jane Baxter as Jill Trevor
 Athole Stewart as Sir Joshua Morple
 Ronald Ward as John Canter
 Jean Cadell as Amy Boswell
 Frederick Burtwell as Phillips
 Gibb McLaughlin as Sheriff
 Vera Bogetti as Rose
 Stewart Rome as Alfred Trevor

References

External links 
 
 Confidential Lady at BFI Film & TV Database

1939 films
1939 comedy-drama films
British comedy-drama films
British black-and-white films
Films directed by Arthur B. Woods
Lost British films
Films produced by Samuel Sax
1939 lost films
Lost comedy-drama films
1930s English-language films
1930s British films